In library, information and computer science, collation is the process of assembling written information into a standard order.

Collation may also have the following meanings:

 Collation (meal), a light meal in some religious traditions
 In succession law, collation is an act of estimating the value of the intestate property
 In ecclesiastical law, collation is the legal process and ritual act by which a parish priest is appointed to their living, especially in Anglicanism
 In textual criticism and bibliography, collation is the process of determining the differences between two or more texts found in the detailed bibliography of a book or the comparison of the physical makeup of two copies of a book
 In printing and photocopying, bookbinding, also called collation, is ordering pages when several copies of a document are bound after printing or copying